Palmerston North railway station is a main station on the North Island Main Trunk serving the city of Palmerston North in the Manawatū-Whanganui region of New Zealand.

It is the northern terminus of the Capital Connection long distance commuter train to Wellington and was a major stop on the Northern Explorer service between Auckland and Wellington until 2021.

A new Palmerston North (regional) intermodal freight hub is proposed by KiwiRail for a site to the north-east of Palmerston North. The plan has been developed with a grant of $40 million from the Provincial Growth Fund, as announced by the minister Shane Jones on 15 November 2018. The freight hub would replace the Tremaine Avenue freight yard, which is to the east of the station and provides mainly for freight to Auckland, Wellington, Christchurch and Dunedin.

Milson deviation
The original Palmerston North Central railway station was opened on 20 October 1876. Traffic increased with the opening of the line to Napier via Woodville in 1891, and the station was moved 30 chains (603m) south in March 1891. But it was still a bottleneck, and remained the longest-persisting bottleneck on the Main Trunk until the 1960s.

Changes were recommended by Hiley in 1914, a commission in 1916 and the Fay-Raven commission in 1924–25. Construction of the Milson deviation to shift the line and station northwest and away from the centre of Palmerston North started in May 1926, but was delayed by the depression and Second World War, and objections from the local business quarter; when work was suspended in April 1929, the reasons given by Prime Minister, Sir Joseph Ward, included the distance of the new station from the town centre.

Work by the Public Works Department (PWD) was stopped on 18 April 1929, when within  of completion, by Minister of Works Alfred Ransom and restarted in 1938 by Bob Semple but halted by the Second World War. Work finally resumed in 1957 under Minister John McAlpine, the first stage to Milson from the north-east was opened on 22 April 1954. The deviation was opened to Longburn for through goods trains on 27 July 1959. On 21 October 1963 the new station and yards were opened, and all rail traffic removed from the main street and square of Palmerston North. The old line was closed by mid-1965, and the Awapuni railway station south of the main station on the old route was also closed. The new route was  shorter than the old.

Current use
The station currently serves one route – the Capital Connection. This service see the station visited by 1 or 2 trains per weekday – down from >60 when the station was opened. Heritage excursions also occasionally use the station. The main building is used as KiwiRail offices or storage, and the old cafeteria is used as a after-school care centre. The station is not served by a city bus route but has a taxi rank.

Gallery

References

Citations

Bibliography

Pierre, Bill, North Island Main Trunk pp. 192–199 (Reed, Wellington, 1981)

External links 
Palmerston North Government offices in the Cyclopaedia of New Zealand (1897)

Railway stations in New Zealand
Buildings and structures in Palmerston North
Railway stations opened in 1963
Rail transport in Manawatū-Whanganui